The 2011–12 Washington Wizards season was the 51st season of the franchise in the National Basketball Association (NBA), and the 39th in the Washington, D.C. area. The Wizards finished the lockout-shortened season with a 20–46 record and in 14th place in the Eastern Conference. It was the last season of Flip Saunders as Washington's head coach, who was fired after 17 games. For the 2011–12 season, the Wizards unveiled a new logo and color scheme, bringing back the "hands" logo used during the 90s when they were still called the Washington Bullets. They also changed their DC logo including the "hands" logo.

Key dates
 June 23: The 2011 NBA Draft took place in Newark, New Jersey.
 July 1: The free agency period begun.
 December 26: The Wizards begin the regular season with a loss against the New Jersey Nets at home.

Draft picks

Roster

Salaries

Regular season

Standings

Record vs. opponents

Game log

|- bgcolor="#ffcccc"
| 1
| December 26
| New Jersey
| 
| Nick Young (16)
| Andray Blatche (10)
| John Wall (5)
| Verizon Center17,102
| 0–1
|- bgcolor="#fcc"
| 2
| December 28
| @ Atlanta
| 
| Nick Young (21)
| JaVale McGee (12)
| John Wall (6)
| Philips Arena17,750
| 0–2
|- bgcolor="#fcc"
| 3
| December 30
| @ Milwaukee
| 
| Jordan Crawford (24)
| Andray Blatche (10)
| John Wall (7)
| Bradley Center17,065
| 0–3

|- bgcolor="ffcccc"
| 4
| January 1
| Boston
| 
| John Wall (19)
| JaVale McGee (14)
| John Wall (11)
| Verizon Center17,458
| 0–4
|- bgcolor="ffcccc"
| 5
| January 2
| @ Boston
| 
| Andray Blatche (28)
| JaVale McGee (14)
| John Wall (8)
| TD Garden18,624
| 0–5
|- bgcolor="ffcccc"
| 6
| January 4
| @ Orlando
| 
| Nick Young (17)
| Jordan Crawford (7)
| John Wall (5)
| Amway Center18,846
| 0–6
|- bgcolor="#ffcccc"
| 7
| January 6
| New York
| 
| Nick Young (24)
| JaVale McGee (10)
| John Wall (9)
| Verizon Center16,998
| 0–7
|- bgcolor="#fcc"
| 8
| January 8
| Minnesota
| 
| Trevor BookerNick Young (14)
| Andray BlatcheJaVale McGee (9)
| John Wall (6)
| Verizon Center13,095
| 0–8
|- bgcolor="#cfc"
| 9
| January 10
| Toronto
| 
| Nick YoungRashard Lewis (15)
| Chris Singleton (9)
| John Wall (9)
| Verizon Center14,077
| 1–8
|- bgcolor="#fcc"
| 10
| January 11
| @ Chicago
| 
| Jordan Crawford (14)
| JaVale McGee (14)
| John Wall (8)
| United Center21,366
| 1–9
|- bgcolor="#fcc"
| 11
| January 13
| @ Philadelphia
| 
| Rashard Lewis (16)
| Trevor Booker (6)
| John WallJordan Crawford (5)
| Wells Fargo Center14,213
| 1–10
|- bgcolor="#fcc"
| 12
| January 14
| Philadelphia
| 
| Nick Young (27)
| JaVale McGee (18)
| John Wall (9)
| Verizon Center13,998
| 1–11
|- bgcolor="#fcc"
| 13
| January 16
| Houston
| 
| John Wall (38)
| Andray Blatche (12)
| John Wall (8)
| Verizon Center15,594
| 1–12
|- bgcolor="#cfc"
| 14
| January 18
| Oklahoma City
| 
| John Wall (25)
| JaVale McGee (11)
| John Wall (8)
| Verizon Center15,075
| 2–12
|- bgcolor="#fcc"
| 15
| January 20
| Denver
| 
| Nick Young (25)
| John Wall (9)
| John Wall (10)
| Verizon Center14,866
| 2–13
|- bgcolor="#fcc"
| 16
| January 22
| Boston
| 
| John Wall (27)
| John Wall (10)
| John Wall (7)
| Verizon Center15,818
| 2–14
|- bgcolor="#fcc"
| 17
| January 23
| @ Philadelphia
| 
| Jordan Crawford (17)
| Rashard LewisKevin Seraphin (15)
| John Wall (5)
| Wells Fargo Center10,108
| 2–15
|- bgcolor="#cfc"
| 18
| January 25
| Charlotte
| 
| Nick Young (20)
| JaVale McGeeAndray Blatche (10)
| Jordan Crawford (5)
| Verizon Center15,286
| 3–15
|- bgcolor="#fcc"
| 19
| January 27
| @ Houston
| 
| John Wall (17)
| JaVale McGee (11)
| John Wall (6)
| Toyota Center13,894
| 3–16
|- bgcolor="#cfc"
| 20
| January 28
| @ Charlotte
| 
| JaVale McGee (22)
| JaVale McGee (10)
| John Wall (10)
| Time Warner Cable Arena17,761
| 4–16
|- bgcolor="#fcc"
| 21
| January 30
| Chicago
| 
| John Wall (20)
| JaVale McGeeTrevor Booker (9)
| John Wall (6)
| Verizon Center18,357
| 4–17

|- bgcolor="#fcc"
| 22
| February 1
| @ Orlando
| 
| Nick Young (24)
| Trevor Booker (8)
| John Wall (10)
| Amway Center18,846
| 4–18
|- bgcolor="#fcc"
| 23
| February 3
| @ Toronto
| 
| Nick Young (21)
| Trevor Booker (7)
| John Wall (4)
| Air Canada Centre16,382
| 4–19
|- bgcolor="#fcc"
| 24
| February 4
| L. A. Clippers
| 
| Nick YoungJohn Wall (14)
| Kevin Seraphin (8)
| John Wall (7)
| Verizon Center19,419
| 4–20
|- bgcolor="#cfc"
| 25
| February 6
| Toronto
| 
| John Wall (31)
| JaVale McGeeKevin Seraphin (8)
| John Wall (7)
| Verizon Center14,687
| 5–20
|- bgcolor="#fcc"
| 26
| February 8
| New York
| 
| John Wall (29)
| JaVale McGee (9)
| John Wall (6)
| Verizon Center17,376
| 5–21
|- bgcolor="#fcc"
| 27
| February 10
| Miami
| 
| JaVale McGee (24)
| Trevor Booker (15)
| John Wall (10)
| Verizon Center20,282
| 5–22
|- bgcolor="#cfc"
| 28
| February 12
| @ Detroit
| 
| Nick YoungJaVale McGee (22)
| JaVale McGee (11)
| John Wall (15)
| The Palace of Auburn Hills12,654
| 6–22
|- bgcolor="#cfc"
| 29
| February 14
| @ Portland
| 
| Nick Young (35)
| JaVale McGee (11)
| John Wall (9)
| Rose Garden20,558
| 7–22
|- bgcolor="#fcc"
| 30
| February 15
| @ L. A. Clippers
| 
| John WallJaVale McGee (18)
| Trevor Booker (8)
| John Wall (12)
| Staples Center19,135
| 7–23
|- bgcolor="#fcc"
| 31
| February 17
| @ Utah
| 
| John Wall (24)
| JaVale McGeeJordan Crawford (6)
| John Wall (5)
| EnergySolutions Arena18,719
| 7–24
|- bgcolor="#fcc"
| 32
| February 20
| @ Phoenix
| 
| Jordan Crawford (20)
| JaVale McGee (9)
| John Wall (6)
| US Airways Center13,921
| 7–25
|- bgcolor="#fcc"
| 33
| February 22
| Sacramento
| 
| Jordan Crawford (32)
| JaVale McGee (10)
| John Wall (11)
| Verizon Center17,085
| 7–26
|- bgcolor="#fcc"
| 34
| February 28
| @ Milwaukee
| 
| Trevor Booker (20)
| Trevor Booker (11)
| John Wall (15)
| Bradley Center13,548
| 7–27
|- bgcolor="#fcc"
| 35
| February 29
| Orlando
| 
| John Wall (33)
| Trevor Booker (13)
| Jordan Crawford (5)
| Verizon Center18,688
| 7–28

|- bgcolor="#cfc"
| 36
| March 3
| Cleveland
| 
| Jordan Crawford (31)
| JaVale McGee (12)
| John WallAndray BlatcheShelvin Mack (5)
| Verizon Center17,759
| 8–28
|- bgcolor="#fcc"
| 37
| March 5
| Golden State
| 
| Nick Young (25)
| JaVale McGee (10)
| John Wall (14)
| Verizon Center17,843
| 8–29
|- bgcolor="#cfc"
| 38
| March 7
| L. A. Lakers
| 
| Nick Young (19)
| Trevor Booker (17)
| John Wall (9)
| Verizon Center20,282
| 9–29
|- bgcolor="#fcc"
| 39
| March 10
| Portland
| 
| John Wall (25)
| Trevor Booker (10)
| John Wall (8)
| Verizon Center18,071
| 9–30
|- bgcolor="#fcc"
| 40
| March 12
| @ San Antonio
| 
| JaVale McGee (21)
| JaVale McGee (15)
| Jordan CrawfordJohn Wall (5)
| AT&T Center18,581
| 9–31
|- bgcolor="#fcc"
| 41
| March 13
| @ Dallas
| 
| Trevor Booker (20)
| Trevor Booker (12)
| John Wall (10)
| American Airlines Center20,319
| 9–32
|- bgcolor="#cfc"
| 42
| March 15
| @ New Orleans
| 
| John Wall (26)
| Kevin Seraphin (9)
| John Wall (12)
| New Orleans Arena14,256
| 10–32
|- bgcolor="#fcc"
| 43
| March 16
| @ Atlanta
| 
| Trevor Booker (18)
| Trevor Booker (9)
| John Wall (9)
| Philips Arena15,241
| 10–33
|- bgcolor="#fcc"
| 44
| March 18
| @ Memphis
| 
| John Wall (25)
| Kevin Seraphin (12)
| John Wall (6)
| FedExForum15,412
| 10–34
|- bgcolor="#cfc"
| 45
| March 21
| @ New Jersey
| 
| Jordan Crawford (23)
| Nenê (10)
| John Wall (8)
| Prudential Center10,097
| 11–34
|- bgcolor="#fcc"
| 46
| March 22
| Indiana
| 
| Jordan Crawford (21)
| Trevor Booker (7)
| John Wall (9)
| Verizon Center15,874
| 11–35
|- bgcolor="#fcc"
| 47
| March 24
| Atlanta
| 
| Nenê (21)
| Trevor Booker (14)
| Trevor BookerJohn Wall (3)
| Verizon Center18,588
| 11–36
|- bgcolor="#fcc"
| 48
| March 25
| @ Boston
| 
| Jordan Crawford (20)
| Trevor Booker (12)
| John Wall (9)
| TD Garden18,624
| 11–37
|- bgcolor="#fcc"
| 49
| March 26
| Detroit
| 
| Jordan Crawford (20)
| Nenê (9)
| John Wall (9)
| Verizon Center15,911
| 11–38
|- bgcolor="#fcc"
| 50
| March 29
| @ Indiana
| 
| Jordan Crawford (20)
| Nenê (13)
| Shelvin Mack (4)
| Conseco Fieldhouse11,505
| 11–39
|- bgcolor="#cfc"
| 51
| March 30
| Philadelphia
| 
| Cartier Martin (20)
| Jan Vesely (11)
| John Wall (6)
| Verizon Center18,066
| 12–39

|- bgcolor="#fcc"
| 52
| April 1
| @ Toronto
| 
| Jordan Crawford (18)
| Chris Singleton (8)
| John Wall (11)
| Air Canada Centre16,858
| 12–40
|- bgcolor="#fcc"
| 53
| April 2
| Milwaukee
| 
| Jordan Crawford (23)
| Jan Vesely (7)
| John Wall (9)
| Verizon Center16,234
| 12–41
|- bgcolor="#fcc"
| 54
| April 4
| Indiana
| 
| Jordan Crawford (28)
| Kevin Seraphin (10)
| Shelvin Mack (4)
| Verizon Center14,561
| 12–42
|- bgcolor="#fcc"
| 55
| April 5
| @ Detroit
| 
| John Wall (28)
| Kevin Seraphin (9)
| John Wall (10)
| The Palace of Auburn Hills12,681
| 12–43
|- bgcolor="#fcc"
| 56
| April 6
| @ New Jersey
| 
| John Wall (18)
| Kevin SeraphinJames Singleton (9)
| Shelvin Mack (8)
| Prudential Center12,783
| 12–44
|- bgcolor="#cfc"
| 57
| April 9
| @ Charlotte
| 
| Jordan Crawford (20)
| James Singleton (12)
| John Wall (12)
| Time Warner Cable Arena10,303
| 13–44
|- bgcolor="#cfc"
| 58
| April 10
| Orlando
| 
| Kevin Seraphin (24)
| Kevin Seraphin (13)
| John Wall (7)
| Verizon Center15,355
| 14–44
|- bgcolor="#fcc"
| 59
| April 13
| @ New York
| 
| Jordan Crawford (17)
| James Singleton (9)
| John Wall (4)
| Madison Square Garden19,763
| 14–45
|- bgcolor="#fcc"
| 60
| April 14
| Cleveland
| 
| John Wall (19)
| Jan Vesely (11)
| John Wall (9)
| Verizon Center17,200
| 14–46
|- bgcolor="#cfc"
| 61
| April 16
| @ Chicago
| 
| Kevin Seraphin (21)
| Kevin Seraphin (13)
| Jordan Crawford (6)
| United Center22,307
| 15–46
|- bgcolor="#cfc"
| 62
| April 18
| Milwaukee
| 
| Jordan Crawford (32)
| Jan Vesely (10)
| John Wall (10)
| Verizon Center14,141
| 16–46
|- bgcolor="#cfc"
| 63
| April 21
| @ Miami
| 
| Cartier Martin (22)
| Kevin SeraphinJordan CrawfordJohn Wall (6)
| John Wall (13)
| American Airlines Arena19,722
| 17–46
|- bgcolor="#cfc"
| 64
| April 23
| Charlotte
| 
| Nenê (18)
| James Singleton (9)
| John Wall (14)
| Verizon Center17,355
| 18–46
|- bgcolor="#cfc"
| 65
| April 25
| @ Cleveland
| 
| John Wall (21)
| Jan Vesely (12)
| John Wall (13)
| Quicken Loans Arena18,086
| 19–46
|- bgcolor="#cfc"
| 66
| April 26
| Miami
| 
| Maurice Evans (18)
| Jan VeselyJames Singleton (8)
| John Wall (12)
| Verizon Center19,537
| 20–46

Regular season

|- align="center" bgcolor=""
| 
| 4 || 0 || 16.8 || .353 || .333 || .333 || 2.0 || .5 ||style=|1.8 || .0 || 3.5
|- align="center" bgcolor=""
| 
| 26 || 13 || 24.1 || .380 || .286 || .673 || 5.8 || 1.1 || .8 || .7 || 8.5
|- align="center" bgcolor=""
| 
| 50 || 32 || 25.2 || .531 ||style=|.500 || .602 || 6.5 || .8 || 1.0 || .9 || 8.4
|- align="center" bgcolor=""
| 
| 16 || 0 || 9.7 || .408 || .217 || .833 || 2.5 || .5 || .3 || .1 || 3.1
|- align="center" bgcolor=""
| 
| 64 || 32 || 27.4 || .400 || .289 || .793 || 2.6 || 3.0 || .9 || .1 || 14.7
|- align="center" bgcolor=""
| 
| 24 || 0 || 14.3 || .402 || .378 || .769 || 1.0 || .4 || .6 || .0 || 4.9
|- align="center" bgcolor=""
| 
| 11 || 6 || 25.8 || .607 || .000 || .657 || 7.5 || 1.7 || .5 || 1.2 || 14.5
|- align="center" bgcolor=""
| 
| 28 || 15 || 26.0 || .385 || .239 || .838 || 3.9 || 1.0 || .8 || .4 || 7.8
|- align="center" bgcolor=""
| 
| 64 || 0 || 12.2 || .400 || .286 || .712 || 1.4 || 2.0 || .4 || .0 || 3.6
|- align="center" bgcolor=""
| 
| 17 || 2 || 23.0 || .440 || .387 || .579 || 3.4 || .6 || .6 || .1 || 9.3
|- align="center" bgcolor=""
|  
| 52 || 0 || 13.4 || .399 || .383 || .778 || 1.3 || .9 || .3 || .1 || 5.5
|- align="center" bgcolor=""
|  
| 41 || 40 || 27.4 || .535 ||  || .500 ||style=|8.8 || .6 || .6 ||style=|2.5 || 11.9
|- align="center" bgcolor=""
|  
| 3 || 0 || 1.0 || .000 ||  ||  || .0 || .0 || .0 || .0 || .0
|- align="center" bgcolor=""
| 
| 57 || 21 || 20.6 || .531 || .000 || .671 || 4.9 || .6 || .3 || 1.3 || 7.9
|- align="center" bgcolor=""
| 
|style=|66 || 51 || 21.7 || .372 || .346 || .682 || 3.5 || .7 || 1.1 || .5 || 4.6
|- align="center" bgcolor=""
| 
| 12 || 0 || 21.8 || .547 || .222 || .933 || 6.8 || 1.3 || .8 || .7 || 8.2
|- align="center" bgcolor=""
|  
| 4 || 0 || 14.5 ||style=|1.000 ||  ||  || 3.0 || 1.3 || 1.5 || .8 || 1.5
|- align="center" bgcolor=""
| 
| 4 || 0 || 13.0 || .278 || .200 ||style=|1.000 || 2.5 || .3 || .3 || .3 || 3.5
|- align="center" bgcolor=""
| 
| 57 || 20 || 18.9 || .537 || .000 || .532 || 4.4 || .8 || .7 || .6 || 4.7
|- align="center" bgcolor=""
| 
|style=|66 ||style=|66 ||style=|36.2 || .423 || .071 || .789 || 4.5 ||style=|8.0 || 1.4 || .9 || 16.3
|- align="center" bgcolor=""
|  
| 40 || 32 || 30.3 || .406 || .371 || .862 || 2.4 || 1.2 || .8 || .3 ||style=|16.6
|}
  Statistics with the Washington Wizards.

Awards and milestones
 John Wall participated in the Rising Stars Challenge and in the Skills Challenge during the All-Star Weekend in Orlando.
 Rashard Lewis scored his 15,000th career point in a 98–77 win against the Detroit Pistons on February 12.

Injuries and surgeries
 On April, Roger Mason, Jr. underwent surgery to repair a broken index finger in his left hand and was out for the remainder of the season.

Transactions

Overview

Trades

Free agents

Many players signed with teams from other leagues due to the 2011 NBA lockout. FIBA allows players under NBA contracts to sign and play for teams from other leagues if the contracts have opt-out clauses that allow the players to return to the NBA if the lockout ends. The Chinese Basketball Association, however, only allows its clubs to sign foreign free agents who could play for at least the entire season.

References

Washington Wizards seasons
Washington Wizards
Wash
Wash